Kunri is a tehsil and town located in the Umarkot District, Sindh province in southern Pakistan.

Notes

References
 
Linda S. Walbridge. The Christians of Pakistan: the passion of Bishop John Joseph.  Routledge. 1st edition. 19 September 2002. 

Populated places in Umerkot District
Talukas of Sindh